Heath Tessmann (born 3 March 1984 in Ayr, Australia) is a rugby union footballer. His regular playing position is hooker. He represented the Rebels in Super Rugby, making his franchise debut in Week 1 of the 2011 Super Rugby season and continuing into the  2012 season.

He signed a short-term contract with the Western Force ahead of the 2013 Super Rugby season in order to provide injury cover for the franchise.

Super Rugby statistics

References 

1984 births
Australian rugby union players
Rugby union hookers
Melbourne Rebels players
Western Force players
Rugby union players from Queensland
Living people
Perth Spirit players